Cillian Farrell (born 1977 in Edenderry, County Offaly, Ireland) is an Irish hurling manager and former dual player. He is the former manager of the Meath senior hurling team.

A dual player at the highest levels, Farrell had a successful playing career at club level with Edenderry and at inter-county levels with Offaly. He was a fringe member of the inter-county hurling team during the 'golden age' of the 1990s and collected an All-Ireland title as a substitute in 1998.

Shortly after his inter-county retirement, Farrell became involved in team management and coaching. He took charge of the Na Fianna hurling team in Meath for three years and restored some pride to the perennial relegation candidates. Farrell was appointed manager of the Meath senior hurling team in October 2010. He stepped down from the position on 2 June 2013 after a 0-23 to 1-10 defeat to Down, however, he returned to the position later that year.

References

1977 births
Living people
Dual players
Edenderry Gaelic footballers
Edenderry hurlers
Hurling managers
Offaly inter-county Gaelic footballers
Offaly inter-county hurlers